Loring W. Tu (杜武亮, Wade–Giles: Tu Wu-liang) is a Taiwanese-American mathematician working in algebraic topology and geometry.

Life 

He was born in Taipei, Taiwan.  He is the grandson of Taiwanese pharmacologist Tu Tsung-ming. He is a younger brother of Charles Tu, who is a professor of electrical and computer engineering (ECE) at the University of California, San Diego.

He currently works at Tufts University.

Career 

He attended McGill University and Princeton University as an undergraduate. He completed his Ph.D. at Harvard University. His doctoral advisor was Phillip A. Griffiths. His dissertation thesis was titled Hodge Theory and the Local Torelli Problem.

He is currently a professor of mathematics at Tufts University.

He has frequently collaborated with Raoul Bott.

Bibliography 

Some of his books and papers are:

 Introductory Lectures on Equivariant Cohomology (2020)  
 Differential Geometry: Connections, Curvature, and Characteristic Classes (2017)  
 An Introduction to Manifolds (2007)  
 Hodge Theory And The Local Torelli Problem (1983)  
 Differential Forms In Algebraic Topology (1982, with Raoul Bott)

References

External links
 
 

21st-century American mathematicians
1952 births
Living people
McGill University alumni
Princeton University alumni
Harvard Graduate School of Arts and Sciences alumni
Tufts University faculty
20th-century American mathematicians